Oliver Davis (born August 29, 1954 in Columbus, Georgia) is a former American football cornerback in the National Football League. He was drafted by the Cleveland Browns in the fourth round of the 1977 NFL Draft. He played college football at Tennessee State.

Davis also played for the Cincinnati Bengals.

1954 births
Living people
American football cornerbacks
Tennessee State Tigers football players
Cleveland Browns players
Cincinnati Bengals players
Players of American football from Columbus, Georgia